1st Signal Brigade may refer to:

 1st Signal Brigade (United Kingdom)
 1st Signal Brigade (United States)